The 2021 Centrobasket Women was the 22nd edition of the Centrobasket and held in the city of San Salvador from 24 to 28 March 2021.

Puerto Rico won their third overall title.

Originally, six teams were about to feature but Cuba withdrew because of the COVID-19 pandemic.

The top four teams qualified for the 2021 FIBA Women's AmeriCup.

Standings

Results
All times are local (UTC−4).

All-Tournament Team
The MVP and all-star team was announced on 29 March 2021.

References

External links
Official website

Centrobasket Women
2020–21 in North American basketball
2021 in Salvadoran sport
2021 in women's basketball
International sports competitions hosted by El Salvador
2021 in Central American sport
2021 in Caribbean sport
March 2021 sports events in North America